Jeremiah O'Sullivan (1940 – 22 August 1985) was an Irish hurler and Gaelic footballer. At club level he played with Glen Rovers and St. Nicholas' and was a member of the Cork senior teams in both codes.

Playing career

O'Sullivan first made an impression as a schoolboy hurler at the North Monastery and in the local street leagues, before joining the Glen Rovers club. He made his first appearance for the club's senior team in 1958 and was a mainstay of the team until 1979, during which time he won two All-Ireland Club Championship titles. He also won two Cork SFC titles with sister club St. Nicholas'. O'Sullivan first appeared on the inter-county scene as a reserve with the Cork minor hurling team in 1958, the same year he won an All-Ireland JHC title. He is also a dual provincial junior championship winners. O'Sullivan made his senior team debut against Waterford during the 1959–60 National League. He was on and off the team at various times over much of the following decade and was at centre-forward when Cork beat Kilkenny in the 1966 All-Ireland hurling final. O'Sullivan also played with the Cork senior football team and was a reserve for the 1967 All-Ireland football final defeat by Meath.

Coaching career

O'Sullivan became involved in coaching as his playing days with the Glen Rovers senior team were drawing to an end. He trained the club's senior team to the Cork U21 Championship title in 1984.

Personal life and death

O'Sullivan suffered a massive heart attack and died while playing a junior league match against Brian Dillons on 22 August 1985. Survived by his wife Kay and two sons, he was 45 years old.

Honours

Player

Glen Rovers
All-Ireland Senior Club Hurling Championship: 1973, 1977
Munster Senior Club Hurling Championship: 1964, 1973, 1977
Cork Senior Hurling Championship: 1958, 1959, 1960, 1962, 1964, 1967, 1969, 1972, 1976

St Nicholas'
Munster Senior Club Football Championship: 1966
Cork Senior Football Championship: 1965, 1966

Cork
All-Ireland Senior Hurling Championship: 1966
Munster Senior Hurling Championship: 1966, 1970
Munster Senior Football Championship: 1966 (c), 1967
National Hurling League: 1969-70
All-Ireland Junior Hurling Championship: 1958
Munster Junior Hurling Championship: 1958
Munster Junior Football Championship: 1962, 1970

Coach

Glen Rovers
Cork Under-21 Hurling Championship: 1984

References

1940 births
1985 deaths
All-Ireland Senior Hurling Championship winners
Cork inter-county hurlers
Cork inter-county Gaelic footballers
Dual players
Glen Rovers hurlers
Hurling coaches
Munster inter-provincial hurlers
St Nicholas' Gaelic footballers